The 2010 Presbyterian Blue Hose football team represented Presbyterian College in the 2010 NCAA Division I FCS football season. They were led by second-year head coach Harold Nichols and played their home games at Bailey Memorial Stadium. They were a member of the Big South Conference. They finished the season 2–9, 1–5 in Big South play to finish in last place. Later it was revealed that the Blue Hose had used an ineligible player and their two wins were vacated.

Schedule

Source: Schedule

References

Presbyterian
Presbyterian Blue Hose football seasons
Presbyterian Blue Hose football